"Shoulder to Shoulder" is a single recorded by British soul recording artist Rebecca Ferguson, taken from her debut album Heaven (2012). It was written by Ferguson and Eg White and produced by Lattimer. It was released as the fifth and final single from Heaven on December 9. In Germany, however, "Teach Me How to Be Loved" was released as the final single instead. Because it was never released as a digital download or physical CD, "Shoulder to Shoulder" is not considered an official single.

Music video
The official video for the song premiered in late November 2012. It features Ferguson performing the song in a recording studio.

Live performances
Ferguson performed the song on This Morning on 10 December and Alan Carr: Chatty Man on 14 December 2012.

Chart performance
Due to little promotion and lack of airplay, the song only managed to chart #76 on the UK Radio Airplay chart. The single, however, became a top 20 hit in Ukraine.

References

Rebecca Ferguson (singer) songs
Pop ballads
Soul ballads
Songs written by Eg White
Songs written by Rebecca Ferguson (singer)
2011 songs
Syco Music singles